List of rivers in Santa Catarina (Brazilian State).

The list is arranged by drainage basin from north to south, with respective tributaries indented under each larger stream's name and ordered from downstream to upstream. All rivers in Santa Catarina drain to the Atlantic Ocean.

By Drainage Basin

Atlantic Coast 

 Palmital River
 Três Barras River
 Pirabeiraba River
 Cubatão River
 Itapoçu River
 Piraí River
 Itapocuzinho River
 Novo River
 Humboldt River
 Itajaí-Açu River
 Itajaí-Mirim River
 Luís Alves River
 Baú River
 Garcia River
 Engano River
 Benedito River
 Dos Cedros River
 Itajaí do Norte River
 Dos Indios River
 Da Onça River
 Da Prata River
 Iraputã River
 Itajaí do Oeste River
 Trombudo River
 Das Pombas River
 Taió River
 Itajaí do Sul River
 Perimbó River
 Do Meio River
 Camboriú River
 Tijucas River
 Do Braço River
 Alto Braço River
 Do Engano River
 Biguaçu River
 Ratones River (on Santa Catarina Island)
 Tavares River (on Santa Catarina Island)
 Imaruí River (Marium River)
 Cubatão River
 Vargem do Braço River
 D'Una River
 Tubarão River
 Capivari River
 Braço do Norte River
 Pequeno River
 Do Meio River
 Povoamento River
 Laranjeiras River
 Urussanga River
 Araranguá River
 Dos Porcos River
 Mãe Luzia River
 Manoel Alves River
 Morto River
 Do Cedro River
 São Bento River
 Itoupava River
 Jundiá River
 Amola-Faca River
 Da Pedra River
 Pinheirinho River
 Mampituba River
 Canoas River (Sertão River)
 Leão River

Uruguay Basin 

 Uruguay River
 Peperiguaçu River
 Das Flores River
 Do Indio River
 Mario Preta River
 Macaco Branco River
 Lajeado Macuco
 Das Antas River
 Sargento River
 Catundó River
 Capetinga River
 Jacutinga River
 Iracema River
 São Domingos River
 Lajeado Sertão
 Barra Grande River
 Chapecó River
 Saudades River
 Burro Branco River
 Pesqueiro River
 Três Voltas River
 Macaco River
 Do Ouro River
 Chapecozinho River
 Do Mato River
 Saudades River
 Feliciano River
 Vermelho River
 Chalana River
 Irani River
 Ariranha River
 Engano River
 Jacutinga River
 Rancho Grande River
 Do Peixe River
 Do Leão River
 São Bento River
 Santo Antônio River
 Quinze de Novembro River
 São Pedro River
 Preto River
 Lajeado Agudo
 Canoas River
 Santa Cruz River
 Inferno Grande River
 São João River
 Caveiras River
 Amola-Faca River
 Do Pinto River
 Marombas River
 Correntes River
 Mansinho River
 Bonito River (Timbó River)
 Das Pedras River
 Tributo River
 Dos Indios River
 Desquite River
 Do Filipe River
 Palheiro River
 João Paulo River
 Bom Retiro River
 Campo Novo do Sul River
 Pelotas River
 Dos Portões River
 Vacas Gordas River
 Pelotinhas River
 Lava-Tudo River
 São Mateus River
 Antoninha River
 Da Divisa River
 Sumidouro River
 Das Contas River
 Capivaras River
 Púlpito River

Paraná Basin 

 Paraná River (Argentina)
 Iguazu River
 Jangada River
 Timbó River
 Timbozinho River
 Dos Pardos River
 Bonito River
 Tamanduá River
 Cachoeira River
 Caçador Grande River
 Paciência River
 Negro River
 Canoinhas River
 Bonito River
 São João River
 Negrinho River
 Preto River
 Bituva River

Alphabetically 

 Lajeado Agudo
 Alto Braço River
 Amola-Faca River
 Amola-Faca River
 Das Antas River
 Antoninha River
 Araranguá River
 Ariranha River
 Barra Grande River
 Baú River
 Benedito River
 Biguaçu River
 Bituva River
 Bom Retiro River
 Bonito River
 Bonito River (Timbó River)
 Bonito River
 Braço do Norte River
 Do Braço River
 Burro Branco River
 Caçador Grande River
 Cachoeira River
 Camboriú River
 Campo Novo do Sul River
 Canoas River (Sertão River)
 Canoas River
 Canoinhas River
 Capetinga River
 Capivaras River
 Capivari River
 Catundó River
 Caveiras River
 Do Cedro River
 Dos Cedros River
 Chalana River
 Chapecó River
 Chapecozinho River
 Das Contas River
 Correntes River
 Cubatão River
 Cubatão River
 Desquite River
 Da Divisa River
 D'Una River
 Engano River
 Engano River
 Do Engano River
 Feliciano River
 Do Filipe River
 Das Flores River
 Garcia River
 Humboldt River
 Iguazu River
 Imaruí River (Marium River)
 Do Indio River
 Dos Indios River
 Dos Indios River
 Inferno Grande River
 Iracema River
 Irani River
 Iraputã River
 Itajaí-Açu River
 Itajaí-Mirim River
 Itajaí do Norte River
 Itajaí do Oeste River
 Itajaí do Sul River
 Itapoçu River
 Itapocuzinho River
 Itoupava River
 Jacutinga River
 Jacutinga River
 Jangada River
 João Paulo River
 Jundiá River
 Lajeado Sertão
 Laranjeiras River
 Lava-Tudo River
 Leão River
 Do Leão River
 Luís Alves River
 Macaco River
 Macaco Branco River
 Lajeado Macuco
 Mãe Luzia River
 Mampituba River
 Mansinho River
 Manoel Alves River
 Mario Preta River
 Marombas River
 Do Mato River
 Do Meio River
 Do Meio River
 Morto River
 Negrinho River
 Negro River
 Novo River
 Da Onça River
 Do Ouro River
 Paciência River
 Palheiro River
 Palmital River
 Dos Pardos River
 Da Pedra River
 Das Pedras River
 Do Peixe River
 Pelotas River
 Pelotinhas River
 Peperiguaçu River
 Pequeno River
 Perimbó River
 Pesqueiro River
 Pinheirinho River
 Do Pinto River
 Pirabeiraba River
 Piraí River
 Das Pombas River
 Dos Porcos River
 Dos Portões River
 Povoamento River
 Da Prata River
 Preto River
 Preto River
 Púlpito River
 Quinze de Novembro River
 Rancho Grande River
 Ratones River
 Santa Cruz River
 Santo Antônio River
 São Bento River
 São Bento River
 São Domingos River
 São João River
 São João River
 São Mateus River
 São Pedro River
 Sargento River
 Saudades River
 Saudades River
 Sumidouro River
 Taió River
 Tamanduá River
 Tavares River
 Tijucas River
 Timbó River
 Timbozinho River
 Três Barras River
 Três Voltas River
 Tributo River
 Trombudo River
 Tubarão River
 Uruguay River
 Urussanga River
 Vacas Gordas River
 Vargem do Braço River
 Vermelho River

References
 Map from Ministry of Transport
  GEOnet Names Server

 
Santa Catarina
Environment of Santa Catarina (state)